UOU may refer to:

 Underwater Operations Unit, Naval Special Operations Command
 University of Ulsan, South Korea
 University of Utah, U.S.
 Uttarakhand Open University, India